Dana Čechová (born 3 September 1983 as Dana Hadačová) is a Czech table tennis player.

She competed at the 2008 Summer Olympics, reaching the second round of the singles competition.  In 2012, she lost in the first round to Miao Miao.

She was born in Hodonín, Czech Republic, and resides there.

References

Personal Pages
2008 Olympic profile

1983 births
Living people
Czech female table tennis players
Table tennis players at the 2008 Summer Olympics
Table tennis players at the 2012 Summer Olympics
Olympic table tennis players of the Czech Republic
Universiade medalists in table tennis
Universiade bronze medalists for the Czech Republic
People from Hodonín
Sportspeople from the South Moravian Region